J. Chris Jensen (born c. 1872, Denmark) was a notable architect from Council Bluffs, Iowa.  He designed 773 buildings during his lifetime across several states in the Midwest and West, including five listed in the National Register of Historic Places.  His family emigrated from Denmark when he was 8 years old, and he raised a family of four sons and five daughters in Council Bluffs.

Architecture

Jensen designed numerous buildings, ranging from private residences to factories to places of worship and large, public buildings.  The majority were in and around Council Bluffs, though several were farther afield.

Selected works:
New City Hall, Council Bluffs
Woodward Candy Factory, Council Bluffs
Hughes-Irons Motor Company, Council Bluffs (National Register 06/23/2011, record no. 491332)
Bennett Building (Council Bluffs, Iowa) (National Register 08/08/2001, record no. 347911)
B'nai Israel Synagogue (Council Bluffs, Iowa) (National Register 03/07/2007, record no. 356109)
Former YMCA building, rear extension, Council Bluffs (National Register 06/27/1979, record no. 79000931)
Evans–Elbert Ranch, Evergreen, Colorado (National Register 9/11/1980, record no. 381360)
Thomas Jefferson High School, Council Bluffs
Bloomer Elementary School, Council Bluffs
Jennie Edmundson Hospital, Council Bluffs
300 Safeway-brand stores across multiple locations
J. Chris Jensen House, 520 Oakland Ave, Council Bluffs
Contributor to buildings in the Lincoln-Fairview Historic District, Council Bluffs, along with many other architects (National Register 04/10/2007, record no. 356268)

External links
New City Hall, Council Bluffs
Woodward Candy Factory
Hughes-Irons building
Evans-Elbert Ranch

References

American architects
1870s births
Year of death missing
Danish emigrants to the United States